The North Pahroc Range is a mountain range in Lincoln County, Nevada. The BLM Big Rocks Wilderness Area protects  of the southernmost portion of the North Pahroc Range. To the south is the South Pahroc Range Wilderness.

References

External links
Big Rocks Wilderness
Big Rocks Wilderness photos by BLM

Mountain ranges of Nevada
Mountain ranges of Lincoln County, Nevada
Wilderness areas of Nevada